Daniel Jarl (born 13 April 1992) is a Swedish football player who plays as a defender.

Jarl made his Allsvenskan debut for Djurgårdens IF on 30 July 2011 starting against Malmö FF.

References

External links
 
 Profile at Eliteprospects

1992 births
Living people
Swedish footballers
Association football defenders
Djurgårdens IF Fotboll players
Enköpings SK players
Landskrona BoIS players
AFC Eskilstuna players
IK Sirius Fotboll players
Allsvenskan players
Superettan players
Ettan Fotboll players